Srinivasan Vasudevan (born 4 January 1962) is a retired Indian professional tennis player. He was born in Madras and was active between 1980 and 1994. Vasudevan was a member of the Indian Davis Cup team captained by Vijay Amritraj which reached the 1987 Davis Cup final against Sweden. Vasudevan represented India at the Davis Cup competitions between 1983 and 1991. He was part of Asian Games Silver Medalist in the Team Tennis Event in 1982. He was also the member of 1990 Asian Games Tennis Team and was part of Bronze Medalist in the Team event

References

1962 births
Racket sportspeople from Chennai
Indian male tennis players
Living people
Asian Games medalists in tennis
Tennis players at the 1982 Asian Games
Tennis players at the 1990 Asian Games
Asian Games silver medalists for India
Asian Games bronze medalists for India
Medalists at the 1982 Asian Games
Medalists at the 1990 Asian Games